Kenneth Donald Cameron (born November 29, 1949), (Col, USMC, Ret.), is a retired American naval aviator, test pilot, engineer, U.S. Marine Corps officer, and NASA astronaut.

Background
Cameron was born November 29, 1949, in Cleveland, Ohio. He graduated from Rocky River High School, Rocky River, Ohio, in 1967. He went on to attend the Massachusetts Institute of Technology, receiving a Bachelor of Science degree in Aeronautics and Astronautics in 1978, and a Master of Science degree in Aeronautics and Astronautics in 1979. He completed numerous courses in Russian language and Russian space systems at MIT, the Lyndon B. Johnson Space Center, and at the Gagarin Cosmonaut Training Center, Moscow, Russia. He later earned a Master of Business Administration degree from Michigan State University in 2002. He enjoys flying, athletics, woodworking, reading, shooting, motorcycle riding, and amateur radio.

He was a Boy Scout and earned the rank of Star Scout. At MIT, Cameron was a member of the Beta Theta Pi fraternity.

Military and flight experience
Cameron was commissioned in the U.S. Marine Corps in 1970 at Officer Candidate School at Marine Corps Base Quantico, Virginia. After graduating from The Basic School and Vietnamese language school, he was assigned to the Republic of Vietnam for a one-year tour of duty as an infantry platoon commander with the 1st Battalion, 5th Marines and later with the Marine Security Guards at the U.S. Embassy in Saigon. Upon his return to the United States, he served as executive officer with India Company, 3rd Battalion, 2nd Marines, at Marine Corps Base Camp Lejeune, North Carolina. He reported to Naval Air Station Pensacola, Florida, in 1972 for flight training, receiving his Naval Aviator wings in 1973. He was then assigned to VMA-223 at Marine Corps Air Station Yuma, Arizona, flying A-4M Skyhawks.

In 1976, Cameron was reassigned to the Massachusetts Institute of Technology, where he participated in the Marine College Degree and Advanced Degree Programs. Upon graduation, he was assigned to flying duty for one year with Marine Aircraft Group 12 at Marine Corps Air Station Iwakuni, Japan. He was subsequently assigned to the Pacific Missile Test Center in 1980, and in 1982 to the U.S. Naval Test Pilot School at Naval Air Station Patuxent River, Maryland. Following graduation in 1983, he was assigned as project officer and test pilot in the F/A-18 Hornet, A-4, and OV-10 Bronco airplanes with the Systems Engineering Test Directorate at the Naval Air Test Center.

He has logged over 4,000 hours flying time in 48 different types of aircraft.

NASA career
Selected by NASA in May 1984, Cameron became an astronaut in June 1985. His technical assignments have included work on Tethered Satellite Payload, flight software testing in the Shuttle Avionics Integration Laboratory (SAIL), launch support activities at Kennedy Space Center, and spacecraft communicator (CAPCOM) in Mission Control for STS-28, 29, 30, 33 and 34.  Cameron's management assignments in NASA include Section Chief for astronaut software testing in SAIL, astronaut launch support activities, and Operations Assistant to the Hubble Repair Mission Director. In 1994, Cameron served as the first NASA Director of Operations in Star City, Russia, where he worked with the Gagarin Cosmonaut Training Center staff to set up a support system for astronaut operations and training in Star City, and received Russian training in Soyuz and Mir spacecraft systems, and flight training in Russian L-39 aircraft.

He was absent from NASA between 1996 and 2003. However, following the loss of the Space Shuttle Columbia and her crew, Cameron returned to the space program in October 2003, taking a founding position as a Principal Engineer in the NASA Engineering & Safety Center, based at the NASA Langley Research Center, in Hampton, Virginia. In June 2005, Cameron was selected as Deputy Director for Safety of the NESC, and in June 2007 he was relocated to the NESC office at the Johnson Space Center in Houston.

A veteran of three space flights, Cameron has logged over 561 hours in space. He served as pilot on STS-37 (April 5–11, 1991), and was the spacecraft commander on STS-56 (April 9–17, 1993) and STS-74 (November 12–20, 1995).

Spaceflight experience
Cameron flew his first mission as pilot on STS-37. This mission was launched on April 5, 1991, and featured the deployment of the Gamma Ray Observatory for the purpose of exploring gamma ray sources throughout the universe. Space Shuttle Atlantis landed on April 11, 1991. On his second mission, he was spacecraft commander on STS-56, carrying ATLAS-2. During this nine-day mission, the crew of Space Shuttle Discovery conducted atmospheric and solar studies in order to better understand the effect of solar activity on the Earth's climate and environment, and deployed and retrieved the autonomous observatory Spartan. STS-56 launched on April 8, 1993, and landed at Kennedy Space Center on April 17, 1993. On his third mission, Cameron commanded Atlantis on STS-74, NASA's second Space Shuttle mission to rendezvous and dock with the Russian space station Mir, and the first mission to use the Shuttle to assemble a module and attach it to a space station. STS-74 launched on November 12, 1995, and landed at Kennedy Space Center on November 20, 1995.

Post-NASA career

Following his first NASA retirement on August 5, 1996, he joined Hughes Training, Inc., a subsidiary of General Motors Corporation, as executive director of Houston Operations. In September 1997, Cameron transferred to Saab Automobile, AB, in Sweden, as Vehicle Line Executive for the Saab 9-3 automobile. He was called "Kalle Comet" by his co workers at Saab. Upon his return to the United States, Cameron worked at the General Motors Technical Center in Warren, Michigan, near Detroit, in positions in World Wide Purchasing, Supplier Technology Acquisition, Research and Development, and Fuel Cell Vehicle Development.

Cameron retired from NASA for good in December 2008 to join Northrop Grumman Corporation as the Director of Houston Operations for Northrop Grumman Aerospace Systems. Cameron currently owns and flies a Cozy MK IV, an experimental airplane of composite fiberglass construction with canard design configuration and pusher propeller. He lives in Houston, Texas.

Awards and honors
 Defense Superior Service Medal
 Legion of Merit
 Distinguished Flying Cross (2)
 Navy Commendation Medal with Combat "V"
 Combat Action Ribbon
 NASA Leadership Medal
 NASA Exceptional Achievement Medal
 NASA Space Flight Medals (3)
 Vietnamese Meritorious Unit Citation
 Admiral Louis de Flores Award (MIT)
 Charles Stark Draper Laboratory Fellowship
 Marine Corps Association Leadership Sword

References

External links

 
 Astronautix biography of Kenneth D. Cameron
 Spacefacts biography of Kenneth D. Cameron
 Cameron at Spaceacts 

1949 births
Living people
1991 in spaceflight
1993 in spaceflight
1995 in spaceflight
United States Marine Corps personnel of the Vietnam War
American test pilots
Aviators from Ohio
MIT School of Engineering alumni
Engineers from Ohio
Michigan State University alumni
Military personnel from Cleveland
United States Naval Test Pilot School alumni
Recipients of the Legion of Merit
Recipients of the Distinguished Flying Cross (United States)
Recipients of the Defense Superior Service Medal
Recipients of the NASA Exceptional Achievement Medal
United States Marine Corps astronauts
United States Marine Corps colonels
United States Naval Aviators
NASA people
Northrop Grumman people
American business executives
20th-century American businesspeople
Space Shuttle program astronauts
Amateur radio people
Rocky River High School (Ohio) alumni
Mir crew members